Kevin Poirier (born July 7, 1940, in Providence, Rhode Island) is an American politician who was a member of the Massachusetts House of Representatives from 1977 to 1999. From 1987 to 1990 he was the Assistant Minority Leader. Poirier resigned his seat in 1999 to become director of development at Sturdy Memorial Hospital. He was succeeded by his wife Elizabeth Poirier.

References

1940 births
Bryant University alumni
Republican Party members of the Massachusetts House of Representatives
People from North Attleborough, Massachusetts
Living people